Halim Zai Shani Khel, or Shanikhel is an area of Halim Zai Tehsil, Mohmand Agency, Federally Administered Tribal Areas, Pakistan. The population is 3,643 according to the 2017 census.

References 

Populated places in Mohmand District